Sutter Creek is a stream in the U.S. state of California.

Sutter Creek was named after John Sutter, a prospector who arrived to the area in 1848, and who was a central figure to the California Gold Rush.

References

Rivers of Amador County, California